Inner City is an American electronic music group that formed in Detroit, Michigan, in 1987. The group was originally composed of the record producer and composer Kevin Saunderson and the Chicago, Illinois, vocalist Paris Grey. Saunderson is renowned as one of the Belleville Three—along with Juan Atkins and Derrick May—high school friends who later originated the Detroit techno sound. In February 2018, Billboard magazine ranked them as the 69th most successful dance artists of all-time.

Musical career
Inner City topped the US Billboard dance chart five times, and had nine top 40 hits on the UK Singles Chart. The group is best known for its early dancefloor-pop music crossover tracks "Big Fun" (UK #8, US Dance #1) and "Good Life" (UK #4, US Dance #1). Other hits include "Do You Love What You Feel" (UK #16, US Dance #1) and "Whatcha Gonna Do with My Lovin'" (UK #12, US Dance #8). The music videos to these songs received significant airplay throughout the world. Later work introduced a hybrid of techno, jazz and swing beats with a more soulful sound in the vein of downtempo British groups such as Soul II Soul and Massive Attack.  The group recorded three albums for Virgin/EMI Records and two singles for Columbia/SME Records.

In the early nineties Tommy Onyx was brought on to be the band leader for Inner City live shows. Onyx co wrote the hits “Hallelujah”, “Fire” & “Bad Girl” and produced the Spanish language version of  Good Life, “Buena Vida”.

In 2017 a new incarnation of the group was formed with Kevin Saunderson’s youngest son Dantiez joining as a permanent fixture. Dantiez and Kevin’s first single as Inner City, “Good Luck”, was released April 14, 2017 on KMS. “Good Luck” features vocals from LaRae Starr and includes remixes from DEAS, Sure Is Pure and Chuck Daniels. In 2018, Steffanie Christi’an was added as vocalist.

In 2020, the Saundersons (Kevin and his son Dantiez) released a new Inner City album with Christi'an as the main vocalist. Called We All Move Together, the title track which featured a spoken word performance from actor Idris Elba. Elba also featured on the single "No More Looking Back", which was the first Inner City project to be released by Defected Records, a British independent record label specialising in house music.

Discography

Albums

 Album was released as Big Fun in North America.

Singles

See also
List of number-one dance hits (United States)
List of artists who reached number one on the US Dance chart

References

External links
 [ AllMusic guide about Inner City]
 Inner City's MySpace Fan Page

Musical groups from Detroit
American house music groups
American dance music groups
American techno music groups
Virgin Records artists
Columbia Records artists
1987 establishments in Michigan
Musical groups established in 1987